Ma Kunyue (born 27 April 2001) is a Chinese footballer currently playing as a goalkeeper for Beijing Guoan.

Club career
Ma Kunyue was promoted to the senior team of Beijing Guoan within the 2020 Chinese Super League season. He would make his debut in a Chinese FA Cup game on 28 November 2020 against Chengdu Better City in a 1-0 victory.

Career statistics
.

References

External links

2001 births
Living people
Chinese footballers
China youth international footballers
Association football goalkeepers
Beijing Guoan F.C. players